Vinceria is an extinct genus of kannemeyeriiform dicynodont in the family Shansiodontidae. Fossils of the genus have been found in the Anisian Cerro de las Cabras Formation and Carnian Río Seco de la Quebrada Formation of Argentina. One species, C. argentinensis, named in 1966, was moved to its own genus, Acratophorus, in 2021. Another species, V. vieja, was merged with Acratophorus argentinensis in 2021, leaving V. andina as the only species in the genus.

References

External links 
 The main groups of non-mammalian synapsids at Mikko's Phylogeny Archive

Dicynodonts
Anomodont genera
Anisian genera
Ladinian genera
Carnian genera
Late Triassic synapsids of South America
Middle Triassic synapsids of South America
Triassic Argentina
Fossils of Argentina
Fossil taxa described in 1969
Taxa named by José Bonaparte